The Chevrolet Adra is a concept subcompact SUV unveiled in Auto Expo 2014 by Chevrolet. The car was designed by General Motors India Private Limited in their Bangalore facility. Production of the Adra was going to be in 2016 or 2017 as an India-only subcompact SUV, but production was cancelled as Chevrolet sales were declining in India, leading to Chevrolet pulling out of the Indian market, along with South Africa, in 2017.

See also 

Chevrolet Trax

Chevrolet Trax (concept)

References 

Cars of India
Mini sport utility vehicles
Adra